The Waggoner Ranch Formation is a geologic formation in northern Texas. It preserves fossils dating back to the Artinskian to Kungurian stages of the Permian period.

Fossil content 
The following fossils have been uncovered from the formation:

Synapsids

 Dimetrodon limbatus
 Glaucosaurus megalops
 Mycterosaurus longiceps
 Ophiacodon major
 Secodontosaurus obtusidens
 Varanosaurus wichitaensis
 Dimetrodon sp.
 Ophiacodon sp.

Temnospondyls

 Broiliellus texensis
 Eryops megacephalus
 Eryops sp.
 Trimerorhachis sp.

Reptiles

 Araeoscelis casei
 Captorhinus aguti
 C. laticeps
 Pantylus cordatus
 Protocaptorhinus cf. pricei
 Reiszorhinus olsoni
 Captorhinus sp.

Cotylosauria
 Diadectes sideropelicus
 Diadectes sp.

Amphibians
 Diplocaulus sp.

See also 
 List of fossiliferous stratigraphic units in Texas
 Paleontology in Texas

References

Bibliography 

 
 
 
 
 
 
 
 
 

Geologic formations of Texas
Permian System of North America
Permian geology of Texas
Artinskian Stage
Kungurian
Limestone formations of the United States
Shale formations of the United States
Permian northern paleotropical deposits
Paleontology in Texas